The Museum of Contemporary Art Santa Barbara (MCASB), a contemporary art museum, is at Santa Barbara, United States.

As a non-profit and non-collecting organization, the MCASB aims at displaying, expressing, discovering, and exploring the potential of the art and design in this era.

The primary objective of the museum is to encourage people to have creative and critical thinking about the arts in our times. The categories covered by MCASB involve various fields of design. It includes the topic of male and female, media, race, and geological study. These projects are put on display either by individuals or in groups. The museum has made a substantial academic contribution to the field of art and design.

The MCASB launches 8–10 presentations and over 30 special events on an annual basis. The main exhibition space is capable of holding three different exhibitions in a year, with each of the exhibition displays running for as long as fourteen weeks. The museum closes between exhibitions for installation and uninstallation.


History 

It was in 1976 that the MCASB was established by a number of artists and art lovers who sought a place where to take enjoyment from contemporary art. Back at that time, it was known as the Santa Barbara Contemporary Arts Forum (CAF). This is an alternative contemporary art space with its focus placed on contemporary art support and exhibits.

Prior to the relocation to the Paseo Nuevo Shopping Center, CAF took up its first permanent home in the Balboa Building, downtown Santa Barbara, in 1990. In 2011, the MCASB, adjacent to the developing Funk Zone, constituted part of the first satellite area around the Indigo Hotel.

The director of CAF states in 2012 took the belief that education and design are what guide the establishment to the next level, for which the management of CAF took the decision of evolution. The MCASB became independent from CAF and a new organization was then set up: the now Museum of Contemporary Art Santa Barbara.

During 2016, the MCASB was granted accreditation from the American Alliance of Museums, which is a non-collecting, non-profit organization fully dedicated to improving education on contemporary arts and experimental design.

Directors

Miki Garcia 
Miki Garcia is an American museum director. She has been serving as the director of the Museum of Contemporary Art Santa Barbara from as early as January 2005. Garcia spent her childhood in Brownsville's border town, located in Texas. Her parents have an art background, they are educators and artists. Being raised by artist parents and growing up in an artistic environment plays a key role in Miki Garcia's decision on her own career direction.

In Santa Barbara Contemporary Arts Forum (CAF), she assumed the role as an executive director in 2004. At the time when she joined CAF, there had been already two years during which no directors worked for this organization on a full-time basis. Garcia displayed her advantage of curatorial background and has achieved a lot for MCASB over the years. She led the efforts to transform the Museum of Contemporary Art Santa Barbara from a locally based art space into a contemporary art museum with sustainable finance that has attracted increasing attention from across the world. Her primary responsibility is to oversee curatorial and public strategies as the chief curator. The strategies have received many foundations significant accolades, for example, the National Endowment for the Art.

Abaseh Mirvali 
Abaseh Mirvali has been serving as the director of the MCASB since August 2018. Mirvali took on this role when the Funk Zone district was in expansion.

The job performed by Mirvali in the MCASB is an independent curator. Mirvali has experience of working in Mexico City, where he served as the executive director in the Colección/Fundación Jumex Arte Contemporáneo. Mirvali took participation in the 2013 edition of the Biennial of the Americas as the executive director and CEO, with the exhibition launched in Denver. In addition, Mirvali was a senior consultant to the U.S. Ambassador for Culture and Education.

In a statement, Mirvali revealed that she had dealt with a group of incredibly unique local people devoted to preserving and enhancing their community and its historical center. She expressed her gratitude to this community for choosing her as a partner to help achieve a shared dream for the future of the MCASB. The whole MCASB crew will continue collaboration with social networks both in Santa Barbara and worldwide to deliver a wider vision of what can be presented by a museum today.

Exhibition

Free Play
The exhibition Free play was hosted at the museum from May 21, 2017 to August 20, 2017. Alexandra Cunningham Cameron served as the director of the exhibition. As explained by Cameron, Free Play is based on the inspiration from a diverse range of life stories, happiness, and creative imagination. To gain a deepened understanding of where the future of human development lies, exploring the material culture is considered to be necessary. Free Play identifies individual objects as a way of learning more about one's destination, starting point, or journey. The exhibition displays an accumulation of items and design separated from the rapid development of the modern world towards increasing proficiency and mechanization. The exhibition foregrounds fantasies and real-life experience. It revolves around play as a powerful instrument for carrying out the design process, delivering work that demonstrates our personal drive toward novelty. This overturns customary ideas about the role played by design in our lives. Every maker expresses his or her own perspective on the world through childhood themes, parody, and contingency. This sense of liberation contributes to the works that are remarkably outlandish, eccentric, and poignant.

The Crime of Art 
The Crime of art was an exhibition staged from November 10, 2018 to February 3, 2019. This exhibition is the solo show of the artist from Oakland, Kota Ezawa.

The aim set for the exhibition is to draw the audience's attention to the reality which is in color pattern, geometric and light.

The Gardner Museum Revisited is among the series in the exhibition. It draws on the works from the Isabella Stewart Gardner Museum. Ezawa infuses the adaptation with a pop facade that circumvents what combines high and low culture and extends the scope of socializing of the pictures. Meanwhile, it makes the divide between the first and its multiplication extended.

The main project of the exhibition is 'The Crime of Art,' which is an animation made in Ezawa's style. The display is to extract the design which practices minimalism reflected in the original design pieces and to integrate the art design, which is known by the artist.

Bloom Projects: Beatriz Olabarrieta, Ask the Dust 
The exhibition is known as Ask the Dust designed by Beatriz Olabarrieta, which derives from the Bloom Projects. It was launched from November 11, 2018 to February 3, 2019.

This exhibition represents the first-ever formal show for Beatriz Olabarrieta in the US. The exhibition is presented in the novel form rather than a film. The objective of it is to develop the concept between drawing and writing and to make them interconnected.

The idea of the exhibition is to explore the meaning of what is behind the solid product. However, it also refers to the dust produced by those things, like the name of the title that represents the concept of 'asking the dust'. Olabarrieta integrates the 'voices' from different field designers as the fictional alter egos of the artist in the project. The voices originating from the artists are the manifestation of their personas and make up the key parts of the artworks. To display another alter ego of human feature, the application of lifeless technology can reflect the idea.

Barry McGee: SB Mid Summer Intensive 
SB Mid Summer Intensive is created by the visual artist called Barry McGee. This exhibition was staged from July 1, 2018 to October 14, 2018. This exhibition puts a variety of creative artworks from San Francisco on display, ranging from drawings, graffiti, to sculptures. Apart from that, in the exhibition, the improvisation work of McGee, produced jointly with others, embodies the creativity and passion of himself.

Andy Coolquitt: …i need a hole in my head 
The exhibition …i need a hole in my head is initiated starting May 18, 2018 to March 7, 2021. The designer is Andy Coolquitt. It encompasses various types of design and art, such as paintings, video, and sculptures. The project is purpose to inter-link different aspects of two separate places, and to introduce the concept of private and public simultaneously. The core of this exhibition lies in the application of abstract geometric to design and craft. The projects in the exhibition involve a variety of different household products.

Cecily Brown: Rehearsal 
The exhibition Rehearsal was staged from January 28, 2018 to June 3, 2018. It was designed by Cecily Brown and planned by Claire Gilman. This exhibition represents the first show of Brown's drawing, covering different themes and displaying more than eighty different sizes of drawings in the MCASB.

The name of the exhibition embodies the concept, which originates from the Old French word rehercier that means to repeat something endlessly to gain a better understanding. The purpose of repetition is to appreciate what is expressed by the design. This concept is reflected in Brown's drawing conveys the idea of Brown's wish for visualization and response to the images. Rehearsal presents the action of looking, which means the steps to look through the image again and again until a full understanding is gained. Exploring the possibility is also part of the idea of Rehearsal. The drawings gave rise to the need for being followed from the start of the line to the end of it. However, the gap for Brown's design is equally crucial to continuing in the canvas. The Santa Barbara Independent described Rehearsal as "innovative."

President of the Board for the Santa Barbara Contemporary Arts Forum    
Jacquelyn Klein-Brown was appointed as the executive director of CAF for her long-held enthusiasm about the art and design and her proactive participation in the non-profit art-related associations.

In 2008, Klein-Brown joined the Santa Barbara County and became the resident of the community. In the same year, Klein-Brown became a board member at CAF. In September 2010, not long after Klein-Brown's move to the town, Klein-Brown rose to the position as the Co-Vice-President. In 2011, she served as Co-chairman for CAF&’s fourteenth Annual Valentine's Benefit Auction.

During childhood, Klein-Brown's family nurtured her to develop an interest in art. Klein-Brown spent years studying Art history at the University of Texas at Austin, from which she acquired plenty of experiences regarding contemporary art. Influenced by this, Klein-Brown embarked on the journey of visual expression in art, and participate in exhibitions.

Throughout the 12 years spent on working at the board for the Museum of Contemporary Art, North Miami, FL, Klein-Brown acquired abundant knowledge of human expression. While Klein-Brown served as vice-chairman, Klein-Brown came to learn about the guidelines for the board and outspread plan, thanks to the close partnership with MoCA North Miami Board chairman Irma Braman.

Due to Klein-Brown's position in the Broward County Public Art and Design Committee, not only did Klein-Brown set up art and design in libraries, air terminals, and other locations, she also launched open exhibitions to assist with the choice over fine art. Funding Arts Broward, an organization aimed at developing and exploring human expression with the different figures of art in Broward County.

References 

Museums in Santa Barbara, California
Contemporary art galleries in the United States
1976 establishments in California
Art museums and galleries in California
Art museums established in 1976